Amanda Francisca Ooms (born 5 September 1964) is a Dutch-Swedish actress and writer. She has acted in both film and TV in Sweden and internationally. She was born in Kalmar.  Ooms participates in season 10 of Stjärnorna på slottet which was broadcast on SVT.

Filmography

1986 – Bröderna Mozart
1988 – Hotel St. Pauli
1989 – Kvinnorna på taket
1989 – Karachi
1991 – Buster's Bedroom
1992 – Ginevra
1992 – Young Indiana Jones
1993 – Vals Licht
1993 – De tussentijd
1995 – No Man's Land
1994 – Mesmer
1996 – Passageraren
1996 – Vargkvinnan
1996 – Wilderness
1997 – Jachd nach CM24
1997 – Chock i nöd och lust
1998 – Mellan Hopp och Förtvivlan
1998 – Getting Hurt
1999 – Doomwatch-Winterangel
1999 – Röd Jul
1999 – Recycled
2001 – Så vit som en snö
2002 – The Forsyte Saga
2003 – Fear X
2005 – Harrys döttrar
2005 – Wallander - Byfånen
2005 – Lasermannen
2006 – Sök
2006 – Linerboard
2007 – Upp till kamp
2007 – Isprinsessan
2008 – Everlasting Moments
2009 – Morden
2010 – Kommissarie Winter
2010 – Himlen är oskyldigt blå
2012 – The Expendables 2
2013 – Disciple
2014 – Accused

Books
Nöd vän dig het (1991)
Tåla mod (2006)

References

External links
Official website.

Amanda Ooms - the placeholder page

1964 births
Living people
People from Kalmar
Swedish film actresses
20th-century Swedish novelists
21st-century Swedish novelists
Swedish television actresses
Swedish women novelists
20th-century Swedish women writers
21st-century Swedish women writers